"Battle" is a song by UK garage musician Wookie featuring vocals from Lain. It was released on 31 July 2000 as the third single from Wookie's self-titled debut and only studio album (2000). Upon its release, the song reached number 10 on the UK Singles Chart and number 81 in the Netherlands. British newspaper The Guardian ranked the track at number one on their list of the Best UK Garage Tracks in 2019.

Release and reception
S2S and PIAS Recordings released "Battle" in the United Kingdom on 31 July 2000 as a CD and 12-inch vinyl single. Six days later, the song debuted at number 10 on the UK Singles Chart, becoming Wookie's first and only single to reach the UK top 30. The song also appeared on the Dutch Single Top 100, where it charted for one week at number 81 in September 2000. Critically, British trade paper Music Week called the track "innovative" and "distinctive", noting its crossover potential. In 2019, The Guardian published their list of the Best UK Garage Tracks, giving first place to "Battle" for its "beautiful" production and writing that the song's "soulful" vocals and gospel-influenced lyrics about surmounting conflict could be perceived as a response to the CeCe Rogers song "Someday". Capital Xtra included the song in their list of "The Best Old-School Garage Anthems of All Time".

Track listings

UK CD single
 "Battle" (radio edit)
 "Battle" (Dobie mix part 1)
 "Battle" (M.J. Cole mix)

UK 12-inch single
A1. "Battle" (full mix)
B1. "Battle" (M.J. Cole mix)
B2. "Battle" (Dobie mix part 1)

UK cassette single
 "Battle" (radio edit)
 "Battle" (M.J. Cole mix)

European CD single
 "Battle" (radio edit)
 "Battle" (Dobie mix part 1)

Australian CD single
 "Battle" (radio edit)
 "Battle" (Dobie mix part 1)
 "Battle" (M.J. Cole mix)
 "Battle" (full mix)

Credits and personnel
Credits are taken from the UK CD single liner notes.

Studio
 Recorded at Soul II Soul Studios (London, England)

Personnel

 Wookie – writing (as Jason Chue), production
 Lain Gray – writing, vocals
 Ed Colman – engineering

 John Davis – cutting
 Tomato – sleeve artwork
 Takay – photography

Charts

References

2000 songs
2000 singles
PIAS Recordings singles
UK garage songs
UK Independent Singles Chart number-one singles